The 2012 PGA Tour Latinoamérica was the first season of PGA Tour Latinoamérica, having converted from the Tour de las Américas which ceased to operate in 2012. PGA Tour Latinoamérica is operated and run by the PGA Tour.

Schedule 
The following table lists official events during the 2012 season.

Order of Merit
The Order of Merit was based on prize money won during the season, calculated in U.S. dollars. The top five players on the tour earned status to play on the 2013 Web.com Tour.

See also
2012 in golf

Notes

References

PGA Tour Latinoamérica
PGA Tour Latinoamerica